Nigel Patrick Murray  (born 22 May 1964) is a British Paralympic athlete.  He is twelve time English National Champion and seven time British Champion and multiple Paralympic medal winner in the sport of boccia.

Murray was born in Leamington Spa.  He won gold in the BC2 class during the 2000 Summer Paralympics in Sydney, Australia.  Although he only reached the quarter finals in Athens four years later he followed this up with a silver medal in the same event, and a gold medal in the team event, during the 2008 Summer Paralympics in Beijing, China.

Since Beijing Murray has continued to win medals with a bronze in the European championship individual event in 2009 and a silver at the World championship a year later.  He was part of the team that took gold at the 2009 Euros. He then took part in the 2012 Paralympics, winning Bronze in the Team BC1–2 event.

Murray was appointed Member of the Order of the British Empire (MBE) in the 2013 New Year Honours for services to boccia.

The current world number 16, Murray lives in Royal Leamington Spa, Warwickshire, and is a keen fan of Leamington F.C.

References

1964 births
Living people
Paralympic boccia players of Great Britain
Paralympic gold medalists for Great Britain
Paralympic silver medalists for Great Britain
Paralympic bronze medalists for Great Britain
Paralympic medalists in boccia
Boccia players at the 2000 Summer Paralympics
Boccia players at the 2004 Summer Paralympics
Boccia players at the 2008 Summer Paralympics
Boccia players at the 2012 Summer Paralympics
Medalists at the 2000 Summer Paralympics
Medalists at the 2008 Summer Paralympics
Medalists at the 2012 Summer Paralympics
Members of the Order of the British Empire
Sportspeople from Leamington Spa